The Second Gillard ministry (Labor) was the 66th ministry of the Australian Government, led by Prime Minister Julia Gillard. It succeeded the first Gillard ministry upon its swearing in by Governor-General Quentin Bryce on 14 September 2010 after the 2010 election.

The members of the ministry were announced on 11 September 2010. It included some major changes from the first ministry, which had in essence been left over from the first Rudd ministry which preceded it.

A reconstitution of the ministry took place on 14 December 2011, with several key portfolios changing hands and other portfolios being redefined. Further changes were made on 5 March 2012 following the resignation of and unsuccessful leadership challenge by the Minister for Foreign Affairs, Kevin Rudd. Gillard implemented a further major reshuffle on 25 March 2013 following an abortive challenge from Rudd and his supporters.

On 26 June 2013, former prime minister Kevin Rudd was once again elected Labor Party leader. Gillard resigned as prime minister with effect from 27 June 2013, and the second Rudd ministry was formed.

Original ministry

The following ministers served in the roles indicated from 14 September 2010 until 14 December 2011.

Cabinet

Outer Ministry

Parliamentary Secretaries

December 2011 to March 2012

The following ministers held office from 14 December 2011 to 5 March 2012. Tanya Plibersek was promoted to the cabinet and was appointed Minister for Health, whilst Nicola Roxon moved from Health to become Attorney-General. The cabinet grew to include Bill Shorten (who took Employment and Workplace Relations from Chris Evans) and Mark Butler, while Kim Carr was demoted to the outer ministry. Nick Sherry left the outer ministry, while Julie Collins and David Bradbury were promoted from parliamentary secretary into the outer cabinet, and Sid Sidebottom was appointed as a parliamentary secretary.

Kevin Rudd left the ministry the day before the February 2012 leadership spill, in which he was defeated by Gillard. Craig Emerson was subsequently named acting Foreign Minister.

Cabinet

Outer ministry

Parliamentary Secretaries

March 2012 to February 2013

The following ministers held office from 5 March 2012 to 4 February 2013. A reshuffle was conducted to replace Kevin Rudd, Mark Arbib and Robert McClelland, who all left the ministry due to the February 2012 leadership spill. Bob Carr was named Foreign Minister, though his appointment was delayed until he took his seat in the Senate on 13 March. Craig Emerson continued to act as Foreign Minister until Carr took up the post. Nicola Roxon added the Emergency Management portfolio to her existing one, and Tony Burke likewise became Vice-President of the Executive Council. Brendan O'Connor was promoted to cabinet as Minister for Small Business, for Housing, and for Homelessness. Kate Lundy and David Bradbury were promoted to the outer ministry, and Bernie Ripoll and Sharon Bird were appointed parliamentary secretaries.

Cabinet

Outer Ministry

Parliamentary Secretaries

February 2013 to March 2013

The following ministers held office from 4 February 2013. The reshuffle occurred after the resignation from Cabinet of Attorney-General Nicola Roxon and Senator Chris Evans, Leader of the Government in the Senate and Minister for Tertiary Education, Skills, Science and Research.

As a result of a failed attempt to reinstall Kevin Rudd as Prime Minister in March 2013, Simon Crean was sacked as a minister. Cabinet ministers Chris Bowen and Martin Ferguson, minister Kim Carr, and parliamentary secretary Richard Marles resigned their positions. On 25 March 2013, Prime Minister Gillard announced a reconstituted Cabinet and Ministry.

Cabinet

Outer Ministry

Parliamentary Secretaries

March 2013 to June 2013
The following Ministers held office from 25 March 2013 until the end of the Ministry in June 2013.

Cabinet

Outer Ministry

Parliamentary Secretaries

See also
 First Gillard Ministry

References

External links
 Ministry List (as at 14 September 2010), Parliament of Australia.
 Ministry List (as at 14 December 2011), Parliament of Australia.

Ministries of Elizabeth II
Gillard 2
2010s in Australia
Australian Labor Party ministries
2010 establishments in Australia
2013 disestablishments in Australia
Ministry 2
Cabinets established in 2010
Cabinets disestablished in 2013